Charles C. Collins (August 27, 1903 – April 14, 1977) was an American football player and coach.  He served as the head football coach at the University of North Carolina at Chapel Hill from 1926 to 1933, compiling a record of 38–31–9. Collins played college football as an end at the University of Notre Dame from 1922 to 1924. He was a member of the "Seven Mules" line that blocked for the famous "Four Horsemen" backfield on Knute Rockne's national championship team of 1924.

Collins attended St. Ignatius College Prep in Chicago and entered Notre Dame in 1921 on a basketball scholarship, but failed to make the freshman team. He died on April 14, 1977, at The Valley Hospital in Ridgewood, New Jersey.

Head coaching record

References

1903 births
1977 deaths
American football ends
Chattanooga Mocs football coaches
North Carolina Tar Heels football coaches
Notre Dame Fighting Irish football players
St. Ignatius College Prep alumni
Sportspeople from Oak Park, Illinois
Coaches of American football from Illinois
Players of American football from Chicago